The 2013–14 Eerste Klasse season was the fourth edition of the Dutch fifth tier since the Topklasse was formed as the third tier in 2010. 

A total 84 teams participated in the league. As usual, the competition was divided into eleven divisions: five divisions play on Saturdays and six divisions play on Sundays. 

The champion of each division was directly promoted to the 2014–15 Hoofdklasse. Saturday champions were:
 FC Breukelen
 FC Rijnvogels
 VV Spijkenisse
 DFS Opheusden
 SV Urk
Sunday champions were:

 JOS Watergraafsmeer
 Magreb '90
 VC Vlissingen
 TOP Oss
 FC Presikhaaf
 Achilles 1894

Teams

Saturday league A (West I)

Saturday league B (West II)

League tables

Saturday 'A' league (West I)

References 

nl.soccerway.com

Eerste Klasse seasons
Neth
5